The Lloyd 40.15 was an experimental triplane fighter that was designed and built in the Austro-Hungarian Empire during World War I.

Specifications (Lloyd 40.15)

References

External links
World War One Aviation: Austrian Experimental Aircraft

1910s Austro-Hungarian fighter aircraft
Aircraft first flown in 1917